Kharaundhi is one of the administrative blocks of Garhwa district, Jharkhand state, India.

About Kharaundhi  Garhwa Garhwa Jharkhand 
kharaundhi a Taluka/Block/प्रखंड, close to nagar uttari railway station, is located 34 km from kharaundhi. it is located in south of Garhwa. It's well covered by Jio, Vodafone, Airtel, BSNL, Airtel 3G, like cellular networks.kharaundhi is two side of uttar pradesh boundary and one side bihar boundary.

Languages
Languages spoken here include Asuri, an Austroasiatic language spoken by approximately 17 000 in India, largely in the southern part of Palamu; and Bhojpuri, a tongue in the Bihari language group with almost 40 000 000 speakers, written in both the Devanagari and Kaithi scripts.

Facilities
Market:   A big market called as Kharaundhi  bazar is situated in middle of the block.
Mandir:  Devi mandir, Thkurbari, and Sankar bhagwan Mandir

See also
Garhwa district
Jharkhand

References

Garhwa district
Community development blocks in Jharkhand
Community development blocks in Garhwa district
Cities and towns in Garhwa district